, also known as Lupin the Third or Lupin the 3rd, is a Japanese manga series written and illustrated by Kazuhiko Kato under the pen name of Monkey Punch. The story follows the adventures of a gang of thieves led by Arsène Lupin III, the grandson of Arsène Lupin, the gentleman thief of Maurice Leblanc's series of novels. Lupin and his gang travel throughout the world to steal treasures and escape from the law.

A large number of albums covering the Lupin III franchise have been released by publishers Columbia Music Entertainment and VAP. Soundtracks for each animated series, movie, special and OVA have been released, as well as compilation and remix albums. The music for the first series was created by Takeo Yamashita, with vocal performances on tracks by Charlie Kosei. From the second television series onwards, most music has been composed by Yuji Ohno.

Lupin III Original Soundtrack

In 1978, Columbia released a vinyl album titled Lupin III Original Soundtrack, which contained several pieces from the second TV series. It was later re-released to CD in 1994.

LP
All tracks written and arranged by Yuji Ohno; except where noted.

Side A
 "Theme From Lupin III" - 3:48
 "Silhouette" - 4:24
 "I Miss You Babe (Yes, I Do)" (Yoko Narahashi, Yuji Ohno) - 4:34
 "Red Roses For The Killer" - 4:48
 "Goodnight Moon-Shadow" - 2:58

Side B
 "Dangerous Zone" - 4:10
 "Sunset Flight" - 2:10
 "Magnum Dance ~ Lonely For The Road" - 8:09
 "Lovin' You (Lucky)" (Yoko Narahashi, Yuji Ohno) - 3:20
 "Love Theme" - 3:02

CD
 "Theme From Lupin III" - 3:48
 "Silhouette" - 4:24
 "I Miss You Babe (Yes, I Do)" - 4:34
 "Red Roses For The Killer" - 4:48
 "Goodnight Moon-Shadow" - 2:58
 "Dangerous Zone" - 4:10
 "Sunset Flight" - 2:10
 "Magnum Dance ~ Lonely For The Road" - 8:09
 "Lovin' You (Lucky)" - 3:20
 "Love Theme" - 3:02

Personnel
 Noriko Iida, Seiji Suzuki, Yuji Ohno - Producer
 Akira Yoshikawa, Yasuji Takahashi, Yoshimitsu Takahashi - Co-Producer
 Atsushi Kitamura, Mikio Shimizu - Director
 Tomiharu Iyobe - Engineer
 Vocals – Tommy Snyder - Vocals ("Lovin' You (Lucky)")
 Sandi A. Hohn - Vocals ("I Miss You Babe, (Yes I Do)")
 Akira Okazawa, Kenji Takamizu - Bass
 Seiji Tanaka, Yasushi Ichihara - Drums
 Larry Sunaga - Percussion
 Keiko Yamakawa - Harp
 Minoru Kuribayashi, Yuji Ohno - Keyboards
 Minoru Soma, Takeshi Shinohara, Yukio Eto - Flute
 Jake H. Concepcion, Tadataka Harada, Takeru Muraoka - Saxophone
 Katsuyuki Sugimoto, Kazuo Usui, Shigeharu Mukai, Tadataka Fukui - Trombone
 Hitoshi Kazuhara, Kenichi Sano, Koji Hadori*, Kunitoshi Shinohara, Masanobu Arao - Trumpet

Lupin III Original Soundtrack 2

In 1978, Columbia released a vinyl album titled Lupin III Original Soundtrack 2, which contained several pieces from the second TV series as well as The Mystery of Mamo. It was later re-released to CD in 1994.

LP
All tracks arranged and composed by Yuji Ohno.

Side A
 "Lupin III '79" - 3:14
 "Tornado" - 2:14
 "Love In Sao Paulo" - 3:34
 "Sphynx" - 5:34
 "Spiral Flight ~ Saint Germant a La Nuit Tombante" - 5:23

Side B
 "Wild Crisis" - 2:25
 "The Way To The Oasis" - 4:37
 "Super Hero" - 2:58
 "Zantetsuken" - 2:55
 "Funny Walk In Old Fashion" - 3:16
 "Love Squall" - 3:31

CD
All tracks arranged and composed by Yuji Ohno.

 "Lupin III '79" - 3:14
 "Tornado" - 2:14
 "Love In Sao Paulo" - 3:34
 "Sphynx" - 5:34
 "Spiral Flight ~ Saint Germant a La Nuit Tombante" - 5:23
 "Wild Crisis" - 2:25
 "The Way To The Oasis" - 4:37
 "Super Hero" - 2:58
 "Zantetsuken" - 2:55
 "Funny Walk In Old Fashion" - 3:16
 "Love Squall" - 3:31

Personnel
 Noriko Iida, Yuji Ohno - Producer
 Yuji Ohno - Arrangements, Composer
 Tomiharu Iyobe - Recording, Mixing
 Yujiro Kasai - Cutting
 Fumihiko Kazama - Accordion
 Michio Nagaoka - Bass
 Makiko Hirayama - Biwa
 Kayoko Ishu Group - Chorus
 Takeru Muraoka - Clarinet
 Yuichi Togashiki - Drums
 Akira Fujiyama, Nozomi Nakatani, Shyozo Nakagawa - Flute
 Tsunehide Matsuki - Guitar
 Minoru Kuribayashi - Hammond Organ
 Keiko Yamakawa - Harp
 Yuji Ohno - Keyboards
 Pepe Anai - Percussion
 Kiyoshi Saito, Takeru Muraoka - Saxophone
 Koso Sakata - Shakuhachi
 Suzuki Group - Strings
 Eiji Arai - Trombone
 Fumio Shiroyama, Shin Kazuhara*, Yoshihiro Nagakawa, Yoshikazu Kishi - Trumpet
 Hiromitsu Katada - Tsuzumi
 Sandra Hohn - Vocals ("Love Squall")
 Tommy Snyder - Vocals ("Super Hero")

Lupin III Original Soundtrack 3

In 1979, Columbia released a vinyl album titled Lupin III Original Soundtrack 3, which contained several pieces from the second TV series as well as The Castle of Cagliostro. It was later re-released to CD in 1994.

LP
All tracks arranged and composed by Yuji Ohno.

Side A
 "Lupin III '80" - 3:40
 "You Are Like Breeze" - 2:48
 "Vicious Glory" - 2:27
 "Love Is Everything" - 3:58
 "C-Dag - Toward The Patrol Line" - 3:04
 "A Monmartre" - 5:06

Side B
 "Mysterious Journey" - 3:11
 "Passart" - 3:47
 "Fire Treasure" - 3:07
 "Tropical Wave" - 2:47
 "Leave You" - 4:20
 "Samba Temperado - C-Dag" - 2:55

CD
All tracks arranged and composed by Yuji Ohno.

 "Lupin III '80" - 3:40
 "You Are Like Breeze" - 2:48
 "Vicious Glory" - 2:27
 "Love Is Everything" - 3:58
 "C-Dag - Toward The Patrol Line" - 3:04
 "A Monmartre" - 5:06
 "Mysterious Journey" - 3:11
 "Passart" - 3:47
 "Fire Treasure" - 3:07
 "Tropical Wave" - 2:47
 "Leave You" - 4:20
 "Samba Temperado - C-Dag" - 2:55

Personnel
 Yuji Ohno - Arrangements, Composer, Producer
 Noriko Iida - Executive Producer
 Atsushi Kitamura, Norikazu Yoshimura - Director
 Tomiharu Iyobe - Recording, Mixing
 Yujiro Kasai - Cutting
 Akira Okazawa - Bass
 Yasushi Ichihara - Drums
 Kiyoshi Hagiya, Takao Naoi - Guitar
 Yuji Ohno - Keyboards
 Takahito Sunaga - Percussion

Lupin the Third: The Woman Called Fujiko Mine Original Soundtrack

The official soundtrack of Lupin the Third: The Woman Called Fujiko Mine was released by Nippon Columbia on December 19, 2012, and features 42-tracks. It was released on US iTunes on January 29, 2013.

Track listing
All tracks written and arranged by Naruyoshi Kikuchi.

Films

Lupin III: The Castle of Cagliostro BGM Soundtrack

In 1994, Columbia released a CD containing excerpts from the score of The Castle of Cagliostro, as well as tracks that were composed for but not used in the film.

 "Toward the Patrol Line (Variation)" - 2:52
 "Fire Treasure (Variation 1)" - 1:51
 "Sneakin'" - 3:24
 "Fire Treasure (Variation 2)" - 2:12
 "A Riddle of Underground Waterworks" - 1:51
 "Fire Treasure (Variation 3)" - 2:58
 "Strange Sensation" - 3:25
 "Fire Treasure" - 3:07
 "You Are Like Breeze (Variation)" - 2:59
 "Wedding" - 1:50
 "In the Lun-Lun Feeling" - 1:37
 "Tropical Wave (Variation)" - 3:20
 "The Plot of the Earl" - 1:30
 "Mystery Zone" - 1:41
 "Lone Wolf" - 2:55
 "Uncanny Night" - 2:38
 "Mysterious Journey (Variation)" - 3:59

Lupin vs The Clone
Also known as Secret of Mamo outside Japan, Lupin vs The Clone was the first Lupin film to be released. Lupin vs The Clone Music File was released by Columbia under the "Lupin III Chonicle" brand on November 19, 2003.

Castle of Cagliostro Music File
Castle of Cagliostro Music File was released on CD by Columbia Music Entertainment on May 21, 2003. The catalog number is COCX-32227.The album contains additional tracks that were recorded during production but never used.

Legend of the Gold of Babylon

Farewell to Nostradamus
The soundtrack for the film Farewell to Nostradamus was released on CD by VAP on July 1, 1995. The catalog number is VPCG-84254.

Dead or Alive
The soundtrack for Dead or Alive was released on July 1, 1996 by VAP. The catalog number is VPCG-84605.

References

Soundtracks
Anime soundtracks
Film and television discographies
Lists of soundtracks